West Virginia Route 107 is a north–south state highway located entirely within Hinton, West Virginia, United States. The southern terminus of the route is at West Virginia Route 3 in the Bellepoint neighborhood of southern Hinton. The northern terminus is at West Virginia Route 20 in the city center. WV 107 is a former alignment of WV 20.

Major intersections

References

107
Transportation in Summers County, West Virginia